Evan Lindquist (born May 23, 1936) is an American artist and printmaker who was appointed to be the first Artist Laureate for the State of Arkansas. He has concentrated on the medium of copperplate engraving for more than 50 years. His compositions are memorable for their emphasis on calligraphic lines.

Biography and education 

Evan Lindquist was born in Salina, Kansas. His father was a lumber retailer in nearby Solomon, Kansas. In 1938, the family moved to Odessa, Missouri. In 1945, the family moved to Emporia, Kansas, where he was enrolled in the Laboratory Training School on the campus of Emporia State University.

In 1950, he began working, for the next 10 years, as a self-employed calligrapher and engrosser. By 1952 his work was national in scope, including hand-lettered fraternity charters and certificates of membership for Alpha Kappa Lambda fraternity. In 1954, he graduated from Emporia High School and enrolled as a freshman at Emporia State University. He was employed as a Biology Lab Teaching Assistant, and later, he served as Staff Artist in the Graphic Arts and Printing Departments. A legendary aunt, Christina Lillian, had inspired Lindquist to become an artist himself.

In 1958, Lindquist earned the B.S. degree at Emporia State University, and he married artist Sharon Huenergardt. They have two sons. He continued working for ESU as Staff Artist until 1960 when Evan and Sharon moved to Iowa City, Iowa. From 1960 to 1963, he studied printmaking with Prof. Mauricio Lasansky at the University of Iowa, earning the M.F.A. degree in printmaking.

In 1963, he began teaching in the Art Department at Arkansas State University in Jonesboro, until he retired from teaching in 2003. In 1981, he was awarded the honor of Outstanding Faculty Member and appointed by ASU President Ray Thornton to be First Chairman of The President's Fellows, a group formed to advise the president. He was awarded the rank of Emeritus Professor of Art, and he continues creating prints in his private studio in Jonesboro, Arkansas.

Works 

Lindquist has concentrated on the process of burin engraving for printmaking since 1960.
His best-known works have explored the topics of string theories, Academe, old master engravers, labyrinths, and several others.

His series depicting old master engravers began about 2006. By 2018, the series had grown to include fantasies and satires about several of the most important and influential engravers of the past six centuries. Master of the Playing Cards, Master ES, Martin Schöngauer, Albrecht Dürer, Lucas van Leyden, Claude Mellan, Hendrik Goltzius, Jacques Callot, William Hogarth, William Blake, Reginald Marsh, Armin Landeck, Gabor Peterdi, S.W. Hayter, Jozef Hecht, Jean Duvet, Israhel van Meckenem, Marcantonio Raimondi, Andrea Mantegna, Mauricio Lasansky, Robert Austin, Diana Scultori, Magdalena van de Passe, Giulio Campagnola, and others. A Lindquist self-portrait ("Man with a Burin") is similar to this series. Most of these engravings combine elements of truth with wild fantasy.

Lindquist's series on old master engravers was shown in 2015-2016 during a nine-month exhibition at Syracuse University Art Galleries, Syracuse, NY.

Judith K. Brodsky wrote in "Man with a Burin", Legacy: Evan Lindquist, Bradbury Art Museum:

Lindquist engraves himself sitting at a chess board, rather than hunched over an engraving plate. The iconography implies that as an artist, he has power over his images the way chess players have over their pieces. But the player (artist) is also subject to risks and may lose as well as win. This self-portrait is typical of the intricacy and complex meaning of Lindquist's iconography in this series.

Jacob Lewis, Director of Pace Prints Chelsea, described Lindquist's engravings in a gallery talk:

Honestly, the gentleman that made these works is probably the highest [skill] level that I've seen in many years. The guy takes a raw plate, a needle and burin, and he's just carving away slightly, and he's just taking proof after proof...I encourage you to look at these closely to find the light marks that create these black shapes, and also it's just perfectly tight as though it's all made in his head, exactly the idea of where are we going? He's obsessive in his mark making and making sure that it works completely all the way through.

Sara P. Armas described modern portraits by Lindquist and Leonard Baskin, bringing new attention to a sixteenth-century portrait cycle known as The Pictorum:

 Baskin’s work is a direct appropriation on the Pictorum
, showing its presence in the mind of artists, as far away as the Americas. Lindquist’s work meanwhile is exemplary of how this tradition has been passed down artist to artist, as an integral part of studio practice. 

His original prints may be seen in many public collections in United States and other countries. He is represented by The Old Print Shop in New York City; The Old Print Gallery in Washington, DC; M2 Gallery in Little Rock; and Sara Howell Art Gallery in Jonesboro.

Selected Museum Collections

Some public collections holding Lindquist prints:

 Albertina, Vienna, Austria
 Arkansas Arts Center, Little Rock, AR
 Art Complex Museum, Duxbury, Massachusetts
 Art Institute of Chicago, Chicago, IL
 Baltimore Museum of Art, Baltimore, MD
 Blanton Museum of Art, The University of Texas at Austin
 Boston Museum of Fine Arts, Boston, MA
 Columbia University Libraries, New York, NY
 DeCordova Museum, Lincoln, MA
 Dublin City Gallery The Hugh Lane, Dublin, Ireland
 Fresno Metropolitan Museum of Art and Science, Fresno, CA
 Herbert F. Johnson Museum of Art, Cornell University, Ithaca, NY
 Joslyn Art Museum, Omaha, NE
 Kenosha Public Museum, Kenosha, WI
 Lauren Rogers Museum of Art, Laurel, MS
 Memphis Brooks Museum of Art, Memphis, TN
 Miami-Dade Public Library System, Miami, FL
 Mississippi Museum of Art, Jackson, MS
 Museo Nacional Centro de Arte Reina Sofía, Madrid, Spain
 Nelson-Atkins Museum of Art, Kansas City, MO
 New Jersey State Museum, Trenton, NJ
 New Orleans Museum of Art, New Orleans, LA
 Portland Art Museum, Portland, OR
 Fine Arts Museums of San Francisco, San Francisco, CA
 Spencer Museum of Art, Lawrence, KS
 Springfield Art Museum, Springfield, MO
 Syracuse University Art Galleries, Syracuse, NY
 Museum of Art and Archaeology, University of Missouri, Columbia, MO
 Uffizi, Florence, Italy
 Whitney Museum of American Art, NY
 Bradbury Art Museum, Jonesboro, AR

Honors 

 2013: Appointed as the first Artist Laureate for the State of Arkansas, 2013-2017
 2010: Lifetime Achievement Award, conferred by The Society of American Graphic Artists (SAGA)
 2010: Centennial list of 100 Most Distinguished Faculty Members at Arkansas State University from 1909 to 2009
 2009: Profiled, 100 Years 100 Voices, 1909-2009. Arkansas State University.
 2004: Governor's Lifetime Achievement Award conferred by the Arkansas Arts Council
 2004: Distinguished Alumni Award, Emporia State University,
 1981: Outstanding Faculty Member, awarded by Arkansas State University
 1981: First Chairman of the President's Fellows, awarded by Arkansas State University

References

External links 
 
 
 Evan Lindquist entry in The Encyclopedia of Arkansas History and Culture
 Evan Lindquist papers, 1970-2001 at the Smithsonian Institution Archives of American Art
 BMA Blog, "Engraving the Master Engravers"
 Scott Ponemone Blog, "Evan Lindquist: An Engraver’s Engraver"
 SU Art Galleries, Evan Lindquist and a History of Engraving
 Arkansas Art Scene, “Interview with Artist Evan Lindquist.”

1936 births
Living people
American contemporary artists
Artists from Arkansas
Artists from Kansas
American printmakers
Modern printmakers
Emporia High School alumni
Emporia State University alumni
Arkansas State University faculty
University of Iowa alumni
American engravers
People from Salina, Kansas
People from Emporia, Kansas
People from Jonesboro, Arkansas
People from Odessa, Missouri